Edward Michael Deliman (born March 4, 1947) is an American prelate of the Roman Catholic Church who served as an auxiliary bishop for the Archdiocese of Philadelphia from 2016 until 2022.

Biography
Edward Deliman was born on March 4, 1947, in Lorain, Ohio.

On May 19, 1973, Deliman was ordained to the priesthood for the Archdiocese of Philadelphia by Cardinal John Krol. Pope Francis appointed Deliman auxiliary bishop for the Archdiocese of Philadelphia on May 31, 2016.  On August 18, 2016, Deliman was consecrated by Archbishop Charles Chaput. As bishop, Deliman had oversight of the archdiocese's Episcopal Region 2 (Montgomery County).  

On May 13, 2022, Pope Francis accepted Deliman's resignation as bishop after reaching the mandatory age of 75.

See also

 Catholic Church hierarchy
 Catholic Church in the United States
 Historical list of the Catholic bishops of the United States
 List of Catholic bishops of the United States
 Lists of patriarchs, archbishops, and bishops

References

External links
 Roman Catholic Archdiocese of Philadelphia Official Site

1947 births
Living people
People from Lorain, Ohio
Catholics from Ohio
21st-century Roman Catholic bishops in the United States
Bishops appointed by Pope Francis